Stellostomites is a discoidal animal known from the Cambrian Chengjiang biota and classified with the eldoniids.

References

Prehistoric animal genera
Cambrian animals of Asia